Givad Khater (also Romanized as Gīvad Khater) is a village in Hur Rural District, in the Central District of Faryab County, Kerman Province, Iran. At the 2006 census, its population was 106, in 24 families.

References 

Populated places in Faryab County